Big Shot (Formerly known as Space Shot) is a pneumatically powered tower ride. It was at one time the world's highest amusement ride in terms of overall elevation above ground level, but has since been surpassed by the Sky Drop rise atop the Canton Tower in Guangzhou.

History 
The ride opened on April 29, 1996, in a special VIP gala opening, one day before the ride and casino opened to the general public. Big Shot was one of the first two amusement rides to open on the Stratosphere tower at the casino opening (the other being High Roller). Even initially, Stratosphere guests exhibited considerably greater excitement over the Big Shot gravity drop tower than they did over High Roller.

Ride experience 
The ride up generates 4Gs during the rapid ascent.

See also
 High Roller (Stratosphere)
 SkyJump Las Vegas
 X-Scream

References

External links
 

Tourist attractions in Las Vegas
Buildings and structures in Las Vegas
Drop tower rides
Amusement rides manufactured by S&S – Sansei Technologies
Amusement rides introduced in 1996
Towers completed in 1996